Roopahera (Roopahera Meena) is a village in Jhalawar district, Rajasthan, India.

Geography
Coordinates: 24.760564, 76.360124.

It is connected to the Jhalawar-Baran Megha Highway Bypass.

Education
Rajakiya Uchch Prathamik Vidhyalya is the sole school in the village and was established by the government in 1963. It is now classified as an upper primary school.

Economy
The economy of the village is mostly dependent on agriculture and some are on services.

References 

Villages in Jhalawar district